Martin F. Howard (September 12, 1892 – April 9, 1969) was a member of the Wisconsin State Assembly.

Biography
Howard was born in Milwaukee, Wisconsin. He received a religious-based education in West Allis, Wisconsin.  He served in overseas during World War I, where he was a sergeant in the U.S. Army infantry.

He worked as an electrician, an automobile dealer, an insurance agent, and as a manufacturer's representative.

Political career
Howard was elected to the Assembly in 1934 and 1936 as a Democrat, until being defeated in 1938. He was re-elected as a Republican in 1946, 1948 and 1950, and defeated in 1952 and 1954. Additionally, he was a Republican candidate for the Wisconsin State Senate in 1942 and 1962.

Death
He died in 1969, and is buried in Holy Sepulcher Cemetery, Cudahy, Wisconsin.

References

External links
 
The Political Graveyard

Politicians from Milwaukee
People from West Allis, Wisconsin
Members of the Wisconsin State Assembly
Wisconsin Republicans
Wisconsin Democrats
Military personnel from Milwaukee
United States Army personnel of World War I
1892 births
1969 deaths
20th-century American politicians
Burials in Wisconsin